Orgodolyn Üitümen (born 29 April 1989) is a Mongolian freestyle wrestler who won a bronze medal at the 2018 Asian Games. He competed in the freestyle 84 kg event at the 2012 Summer Olympics and was eliminated by Dato Marsagishvili in the 1/8 finals. At the 2015 World Wrestling Championships, he lost to Abdulrashid Sadulaev in round of 16. At the 2016 Olympics, he lost his first bout to Mihail Ganev.

Üitümen took up wrestling in 2007. He is married and has a child.

References

External links
 

1989 births
Living people
Olympic wrestlers of Mongolia
Wrestlers at the 2012 Summer Olympics
Wrestlers at the 2016 Summer Olympics
People from Övörkhangai Province
Mongolian male sport wrestlers
Wrestlers at the 2018 Asian Games
Medalists at the 2018 Asian Games
Asian Games medalists in wrestling
Asian Games bronze medalists for Mongolia
20th-century Mongolian people
21st-century Mongolian people